Senator Forrester may refer to:

James H. Forrester (1870–1928), Illinois State Senate
James Forrester (politician) (1937–2011), North Carolina State Senate
Jeanie Forrester (born 1958), New Hampshire State Senate

See also
George H. Forster (1838–1888), New York State Senate